The Kwanika Range is a small subrange of the Swannell Ranges of the Omineca Mountains, bounded by Kwanika Creek, Klawli River and Nation River in northern British Columbia, Canada.

References

Kwanika Range in the Canadian Mountain Encyclopedia

Swannell Ranges